The 1998 U.S. 500 Presented by Toyota was the twelfth round of the 1998 CART FedEx Champ Car World Series season, held on July 26, 1998, at the Michigan International Speedway in Brooklyn, Michigan. The race saw a record 63 lead changes due to the draft of the new Hanford Device, and was won by Greg Moore after a thrilling battle in the last five laps with Jimmy Vasser, Alex Zanardi and Scott Pruett.

The race was marred by a crash on lap 175. Adrián Fernández slammed into the outside wall in the fourth turn. His right front wheel was torn off and hurled over the fence into the stands, killing three spectators (Kenneth Fox, Sheryl Laster, and Michael Tautkus) and injuring six others. A subsequent incident in the rival series' VisionAire 500K the following year resulted in both open-wheel sanctioning bodies (and NASCAR, initially for its Modified Tour series) requiring tethers be installed in wheel hubs, as well as changes to catch fencing on oval tracks, to prevent such re-occurrence.

Classification

Race

Caution flags

Lap Leaders

Point standings after race

References 

US 500
Michigan Indy 400
US